Saleka Shyamalan, known professionally as Saleka, is an American R&B singer-songwriter.

Early life and career 
Saleka was born in 1996 as the eldest daughter of filmmaker M. Night Shyamalan. She studied classical piano as a child but decided to pursue a singing and songwriting career at the age of 16. She studied Literary Arts and Music at Brown University and has opened for acts like Boyz II Men, Baby Rose and Summer Walker. Upon debuting her first single, "Clarity", in September 2020, Refinery29 called Saleka "a new artist to watch". Saleka frequently collaborates with her younger sister, Ishana, who has directed a majority of her music videos.

Her forthcoming debut album, Seance, is due to be released in late 2022. Saleka recorded the majority of Seance at MilkBoy studios, Philadelphia.

In 2021, Saleka released "The Sky Cries" for the second season of Servant. The music video for the single was directed by her father, M. Night Shyamalan. She released three more songs for the third season of the series. The four songs were compiled in an EP, released on March 25, 2022. Within the show's canon Saleka's songs are mentioned to be from the never-seen, in-show performer, Vivian Dale, who is mentioned to have died tragically.

In June 2022, Giveon announced Saleka as one four supporting acts for his North American Give or Take Tour, scheduled between August and September 2022.

Discography

Studio albums

Extended plays

Singles

Music videos

References 

1996 births
Living people
American musicians
Brown University alumni
American people of Indian Tamil descent
American people of Malayali descent
American musicians of Indian descent
Singers from Pennsylvania